is a Japanese modern pentathlete. He competed at the 1988 Summer Olympics.

References

1961 births
Living people
Japanese male modern pentathletes
Olympic modern pentathletes of Japan
Modern pentathletes at the 1988 Summer Olympics